Duke Zhuang of Qi may refer to:

Duke Zhuang I of Qi, reigned 794–731 BC in the state of Qi
Duke Zhuang II of Qi, reigned 553–548 BC in the state of Qi